Venkatarama Ramalingam, or V. Ramalingam Pillai (19 October 1888 – 24 August 1972), was a Tamil poet from Tamil Nadu, India and independence fighter. He is well known for his poems about independence. He had 7 siblings apart from himself.

The poem
"கத்தியின்றி ரத்தமின்றி
யுத்தமொன்று வருகுது
சத்தியத்தின் நித்தியத்தை
நம்பும்யாரும் சேருவீர்..." was very famous poem among freedom fighters in Tamil Nadu.

Early life
V. Ramalingam Pillai, popularly known as Namakkal Kavignar, was born  on 19 October 1888 at Mohanur, Namakkal District in Tamil Nadu to Venkataraman and Ammaniammaal. His father was working in police department at Mohanur and his mother was a pious lady. He was the eighth child of his parents. Ramalingam had his school educations in Namakkal and Coimbatore. He did his BA in 1909, from Bishop Heber College at Trichy.
Initially he worked as a clerk at Namakkal Tahsildar's office and later worked as a primary school teacher.

Nationalist
He wrote hundreds of poems with patriotic fervor. He also participated in the Salt Satyagraha against British government in 1930 and went to jail for one year.

Awards
He received the "Padmabhushan" award in 1971 from the Indian government.

References

1888 births
1972 deaths
Tamil-language writers
20th-century Indian poets
Recipients of the Padma Bhushan in literature & education
Tirukkural commentators
Indian male poets
Poets from Tamil Nadu
20th-century Indian male writers
Indian independence activists from Tamil Nadu